Czech Republic competed at the 2016 Winter Youth Olympics in Lillehammer, Norway from 12 to 21 February 2016.

Medalists

Medalists in mixed NOCs events

Alpine skiing

Boys

Girls

Parallel mixed team

Biathlon

Boys

Girls

Mixed

Cross-country skiing

Boys

Girls

Curling

Mixed team

Team
Martin Blahovec
Andrea Krupanská
Pavel Mareš
Kristina Podrábská

Round Robin

Draw 1

Draw 2

Draw 3

Draw 4

Draw 5

Draw 6

Draw 7

Mixed doubles

Figure skating

Couples

Mixed NOC team trophy

Freestyle skiing

Ski cross

Ice hockey

Girls' tournament

Roster

 Kristýna Bláhová
 Nikola Dýcková
 Magdalena Erbenová
 Martina Exnerova
 Alexandra Halounová
 Sandra Halounová
 Karolina Hornická
 Karolina Kotounová
 Klára Jandušíková
 Karolina Juricova
 Anna Kotounova
 Šárka Krejníková
 Laura Lerchová
 Veronika Lorencová
 Barbora Machalová
 Natálie Mlýnková
 Adéla Škrdlová

Group Stage

Semifinals

Gold medal game

Final Rank:

Luge

Individual sleds

Mixed team relay

Nordic combined 

Individual

Nordic mixed team

Ski jumping 

Individual

Team

Snowboarding

Halfpipe

Snowboard cross

Snowboard and ski cross relay

Qualification legend: FA – Qualify to medal round; FB – Qualify to consolation round

Speed skating

Girls

Mixed team sprint

See also
Czech Republic at the 2016 Summer Olympics

References

2016 in Czech sport
Nations at the 2016 Winter Youth Olympics
Czech Republic at the Youth Olympics